Skinnarbøl is a manor house and estate located east of the Norwegian city Kongsvinger.

History 
Close to the Swedish border and Finnskogen, the estate lands have historically belonged to several families including the Swedish noble families Natt och Dag and Oxenstierna. The estate manor house, often referred to as Grenseslottet («The Border Palace»), was completed in 1849 and is decorated in Empire style.

The manor was frequently used by King Oscar II and his wife Queen Sopihia between 1892 and 1905. Queen Sopihia's poor health often required her to use a wheelchair and she became particularly fond of the estate as the manor house only had a single floor and large doorways. The Queen therefore often preferred spending her time in Norway at Skinnarbøl while King Oscar would reside more at the Royal Palace in Oslo. The manor is today legally protected by Riksantikvaren.

References

Manor houses in Norway
Kongsvinger
Buildings and structures in Innlandet